Charles Porter (1756–1830) was Speaker of the Pennsylvania House of Representatives in 1805–1806.

Charles Porter was elected to the Pennsylvania House of Representatives from Fayette County in 1800 and served through 1807. He served as an associate judge in Fayette County from 1821–1841.

See also
 Speaker of the Pennsylvania House of Representatives

References

Members of the Pennsylvania House of Representatives
Speakers of the Pennsylvania House of Representatives
1756 births
1830 deaths